Live at Winterland '76 is a live album by the Electric Light Orchestra (ELO). It was released in 1998.

Recorded in 1976 during the band's Face the Music Tour, this album, along with 1974's The Night the Light Went On in Long Beach are two official releases of the band performing live. Bassist Kelly Groucutt features prominently, taking over lead vocal duty on some tracks. The album also gives the listener a rare opportunity to hear the "Eldorado Suite" performed live (although "Poorboy (The Greenwood)" was edited out of the Suite on this release), plus a live version of The Move's only US hit "Do Ya" before it was re-recorded by the band for their 1976 album A New World Record. This album also excludes the cello solo by Hugh McDowell and the violin solo by Mik Kaminski.

Track listing

Personnel
 Jeff Lynne – Vocals, Guitar
 Bev Bevan – Drums
 Richard Tandy – Keyboards
 Kelly Groucutt – Bass, Vocals
 Mik Kaminski – Violin
 Hugh McDowell – Cello
 Melvyn Gale – Cello

References

Albums produced by Jeff Lynne
Electric Light Orchestra live albums
1998 live albums